Maurice Geldhof (22 October 1905 in Moorslede – 26 April 1970 in Wevelgem) was a Belgian professional road bicycle racer. In the 1927 Tour de France, he won the 19th stage.

Major results

1927
Bordeaux-Toulouse
Tour de France:
Winner stage 19
10th place overall classification

External links 
 
 
 Official Tour de France results for Maurice Geldhof

Belgian male cyclists
1905 births
1970 deaths
Belgian Tour de France stage winners
Cyclists from West Flanders
People from Moorslede